Pterocarpus rotundifolius, the round-leaved bloodwood, is a species of fabaceous tree that is native to mesic and well-watered woodlands of Africa south of the equator.

Subspecies
Up to three subspecies are recognized, but specimens with intermediate characteristics are common.
 Pterocarpus rotundifolius subsp. rotundifolius
 Pterocarpus rotundifolius subsp. martinii (Dunkley) Mend. & Sousa
 Pterocarpus rotundifolius subsp. polyanthus (Harms) Mendonca & Sousa

Gallery

References

Trees of Africa
Trees of South Africa
rotundifolius